The House of Flowers is a Mexican television show created by Manolo Caro for Netflix, which also broadcasts it. It premiered simultaneously worldwide on the streaming service on August 10, 2018, with the final season being released on April 23, 2020.

Series overview

Episodes

Season 1 (2018)

Season 2 (2019)

Special (2019) 
The special episode, published on Netflix separate to the series as a short film, was released on November 1, 2019, or Día de muertos. It shows the funeral of Virginia and also connects other plot points from the second season.

Season 3 (2020)

References

Sources

House of Flowers, The
House of Flowers, The
The House of Flowers (TV series)